Eleanor Rand Wilner (born 1937) is an American poet and editor.

Life
Wilner obtained her bachelor's  from Goucher College and her Ph.D. from Johns Hopkins University. Her graduate dissertation concerned the topic of imagination and was later published as Gathering the Winds: Visionary Imagination and Radical Transformation of Self and Society (1975).

She was editor of The American Poetry Review and she is Advisory Editor of Calyx.
She has taught at the University of Chicago, Northwestern University, and Smith College. 
She is on the faculty of the MFA Program for Writers at Warren Wilson College, and lives in Philadelphia.

In 2019, she won the Robert Frost Medal, the Poetry Society of America's award for a "distinguished lifetime service to American poetry."

She has been active in civil rights and peace movements.

Awards
Robert Frost Medal (2019)
 MacArthur Fellowship (1991)
 National Endowment for the Arts fellowship
 Juniper Prize
 Pushcart Prizes (awarded twice)

Works
 Shekhinah (poems), University of Chicago Press (Chicago, IL), 1984. 
 
 
 
 The Girl with Bees in Her Hair (Copper Canyon Press, 2004) 
 Tourist in Hell (University of Chicago Press, 2010)

Anthologies

Translations

Non-fiction
"Poetry and the Pentagon: Unholy Alliance?", Poetry Foundation, 3.2.06
 Gathering the Winds: Visionary Imagination and Radical Transformation of Self and Society, Johns Hopkins University Press (Baltimore, MD), 1975.

Awards

 Robert Frost Medal (2019)
MacArthur Fellowship (1991)
National Endowment for the Arts fellowship
 Juniper Prize
 Pushcart Prizes (awarded twice)

References

External links
"An E-view with Eleanor Wilner", ''The Drunken Boat", Rebecca Seiferle, 2000

1937 births
Living people
American women poets
Goucher College alumni
Johns Hopkins University alumni
MacArthur Fellows
National Endowment for the Arts Fellows
National Heritage Fellowship winners
Northwestern University faculty
Smith College faculty
University of Chicago faculty
Warren Wilson College faculty
Poets from Ohio
American women academics
21st-century American women writers
21st-century American poets
20th-century American women writers
20th-century American poets